Kitamura (written: 北村) is a Japanese surname. Notable people with the surname include:

Akihiro Kitamura (born 1979), a Japanese actor and director
Akiko Kitamura (born 1988), a Japanese figure skater
Akira Kitamura, game director
Eiji Kitamura (born 1929), a Japanese jazz clarinetist
Eiki Kitamura (born 1981), a Japanese actor
Eri Kitamura (born 1987), a Japanese voice actress and singer
Harue Kitamura (born 1928), Mayor of Ashiya, Hyogo
Kazuki Kitamura (born 1969), a Japanese film and television actor
Kōichi Kitamura (1931–2007), a Japanese voice actor 
Kusuo Kitamura (1917–1996), a Japanese swimmer who competed at the 1932 Summer Olympics
Kyoko Kitamura, a musician residing in New York City
Ryuhei Kitamura (born 1969), a Japanese filmmaker
Ryuji Kitamura (born 1981), a Japanese football player
Satoshi Kitamura, a renowned children's picture book author and illustrator
Sayo Kitamura (1900-1967), founder of the Tensho Kotai Jingukyo
Seigo Kitamura (born 1947), a Japanese politician of the Liberal Democratic Party
Shigeo Kitamura (born 1945), a Japanese politician of the Liberal Democratic Party
Siro Kitamura (1906–2002), a Japanese botanist
, Japanese cross-country skier
Kitamura Tokoku (1868–1894), the pen name of a poet, essayist and one of the founders of the modern Japanese romantic literary movement in late Meiji period Japan
Tomotaka Kitamura (born 1982), a Japanese football player
, Japanese swimmer

Fictional characters 

 Yusaku Kitamura, a character in the light novel series Toradora!

See also
Kita, Hokkaidō (Kita-mura), a village located in Sorachi District, Sorachi, Japan
Reticulate acropigmentation of Kitamura, linear palmar pits and pigmented macules 1 to 4 mm in diameter on the volar and dorsal aspects of the hands and feet
Kitamura-gumi, a yakuza gang who committed the Ōmuta murders 

Japanese-language surnames